Gentlemen in White Vests is a 1970 German comedy film directed by Wolfgang Staudte and starring Martin Held, Walter Giller and Heinz Erhardt.

It was shot at the Spandau Studios and on location around Berlin at the Olympiastadion, Tempelhof Airport and Charlottenburg.

Plot
At the beginning of the film, gangster Bruno Stiegler alias Dandy returns to West Berlin from the United States as a boxing promoter. The boxing business serves him more as a camouflage, however, because soon it turns out that he and his gang want to realize various planned raids. 
The now retired Judge Zänker has tried in vain to put Dandy behind bars by legal means during his active service. Now he turns the tables with his friends and sister Elisabeth. His old friends and colleagues meet as a men's choir disguised in his home and prove to be a pensioner's gang, taking on Dandy's gang. He succeeds in this by using the ex-con Pietsch as a snitch in Dandy's gang.

Dandy wants to steal the revenue from a Hertha BSC football match from the Olympic Stadium, but Zänker and his gang are faster in doing so. The same is achieved by them with Dandy's attempt to rob dubious businessman Kunkelmann's cash cabinet and clear up the Haase jewellery store during a parade. 
To make matters more complicated, Zänker's son-in-law Walter, who lives with his daughter Monika in the house near Zänker, works as a criminal inspector with the police and is charged with clearing up these crimes. In fact, Walter's supervisor commissioner, Berg, eventually appears in person at his old friend's house to arrest him. In a conversation under four eyes, Zänker initiates the Commissioner in his motive and method and gains his understanding.
So an arrest warrant goes out for Dandy, and Zänker manages, with the help of Pietsch, to cheer all the stolen items to Dandy. Immediately before Dandy's departure, all the predatory material is found in his suitcase. This justifies the appearances for the police, that Dandy actually committed the crimes, and that Dandy is being taken away. In fact, after his retirement, Zänker has finally managed what he has tried to do legally in his profession for a long time in vain.

Cast 
 Martin Held as Oberlandesgerichtsrat a. D. Herbert Zänker
 Walter Giller as Inspektor Walter Knauer
 Heinz Erhardt as Heinrich Scheller
 Mario Adorf as Dandy Stiegler
 Agnes Windeck as Elisabeth Zänker
 Hannelore Elsner as Susan
 Rudolf Platte as Pietsch
 Willy Reichert as Kriminalrat a.D. Otto Sikorski
 Sabine Bethmann as Monika Knauer
 Rudolf Schündler as Diplomingenieur Willy Stademann
 Herbert Fux as Luigi Pinelli
 Siegfried Schürenberg as Kommissar Berg
 Wilhelm von Homburg as Boxer Max Graf
 Otto Graf
 Max Nosseck

References

External links 

1970 films
1970s crime comedy films
German crime comedy films
West German films
1970s German-language films
Films directed by Wolfgang Staudte
Films set in Berlin
United Artists films
1970 comedy films
Films shot at Spandau Studios
1970s German films